Montague Modlyn (23 May 1921 – 6 May 1994), known as Monty Modlyn, was a British journalist, best known as a radio and TV presenter. Modlyn worked extensively on radio and TV, often as a roving reporter.

Early life 
Modlyn was born in Lambeth, the son of a Jewish tailor, and left school at 14. His family owned two clothes shops and a market stall in Lower Marsh, Waterloo. Modlyn worked as a proofreader's assistant for the Daily Mail and then wrote for the South London Press and the Evening Standard. He then worked as a hairdresser before joining the family business.

Career 
During the second world war he served in the RAF. In 1942, on leave from the RAF, he first broadcast Down Lambeth Way, a talks programme for Forces radio. After the war, Modlyn submitted a string of programme ideas to the BBC, without success.

In 1949 he was elected as a Labour councillor to the Metropolitan Borough of Lambeth in the Prince's ward, and again in 1953 to the Bishop's ward and finally to the Marsh ward in 1956.

In 1964, Modlyn was an outside broadcaster for the Jack de Manio early morning radio programme Today. In the late 1960s he did pilot shows for Tyne Tees TV, including a Christmas Special. He presented The World of Monty Modlyn for Tyne Tees and in 1969 he moved to Thames Television as a reporter on Eamonn Andrews' evening magazine programme Today.

Modlyn cultivated an East End working-class image, together with an apparent lack of respect for the rich and famous. His classic interview in this vein was with Ugandan dictator Idi Amin Dada, whom he asked how many people he had murdered. Amin responded "You very cheeky man!" 
Modlyn was delighted by that, and adopted a theme song:
Pardon my cheek, and the way that I speak, but no matter where I go
To common or gentry, I talk element'ry
In the only way I know.

Modlyn published his autobiography, Pardon My Cheek, in 1971.

In 1973 he joined the original team at Capital Radio and four years later in 1977 he moved to LBC radio. On LBC he presented Monty Modlyn at Large and a series called Monty's Pub where he visited a different public house every week. As well as pubs, Modlyn had a fondness for smoked salmon and cream cheese Beigels, which he would consume on air each week during his Sunday evening phone-in show on LBC. In the summer of 1979, Jeremy Beadle approached LBC and told them to sack Modlyn, let him take over the show, and he would give them a younger audience. This Beadle achieved until his own sacking in June 1980.

Former BBC Producer Roger Ordish has claimed as part of an audiobook 'extra' to the documentary maker Louis Theroux's autobiography, that Modlyn was his first choice to present what later became titled Jim'll Fix It but that he was overruled.

In 1982 Radio 4 broadcast Modlyn Through, a portrait of the broadcaster.

Personal life and death 
Modlyn married Dorothy Harris in 1959 in Hackney, London. The couple had no children. His personalised car number plate was MM 405, which were his initials and the number of lines on early TV sets. He was awarded an OBE in 1983 for has charitable work, most notably for the RSPCA.

Modlyn died in Charing Cross Hospital, Hammersmith of a cerebral haemorrhage on 6 May 1994, aged 72. His widow died in January 2017.

References 

1921 births
1994 deaths
British male journalists
British radio personalities
LBC radio presenters